The 2011–12 Slovak 2. Liga season was the 19th season of the Slovak 2. Liga, the third-level competition in Slovakia. 14 teams, divided into two groups, participated in the league, with the top two teams from each group qualifying for the final round. HK Iskra Partizánske won the championship but weren't promoted to the Slovak 1. Liga.

Regular season

Western Group

Eastern Group

Final Round
 HK Iskra Partizánske - HKM Rimavská Sobota 3:2 SO, 2:3, 4:3

1. Liga Qualification
 HK 2016 Trebišov - HK Iskra Partizánske 4:0, 8:2, 4:0, 10:2

References
 EliteProspects.com
 EuroHockey.com

Slovak 2
Slovak 2. Liga seasons
2011–12 in Slovak ice hockey leagues